Kemben (Indonesian: kemban) is an Indonesian female torso wrap historically common in Java, Bali, and other part of Indonesian archipelago. It is made by wrapping a piece of kain (clothes), either plain, batik printed, velvet, or any type of fabrics, covering the chest wrapped around the woman's torso.

History 

Prior to the prevalence of kebaya, it is believed that kemben was the most popular and common female dress in the ancient and classical period of Java. It is commonly worn in the Majapahit era until the Mataram Sultanate. Today, this shoulder-baring garment still features in many Indonesian rituals, traditional Javanese dances or palace ceremonies in Javanese keratons.

The bare shoulders of the kemben may be regarded as a representation of aesthetics, elegance, and femininity. In recent decades, however, kemben has fallen out of favor among Javanese Muslim women as they abandoned their traditional fashion and wear Islamic clothing such as hijab, which was previously uncommon in Indonesia. Today, the tradition of wearing kemben were preserved and kept alive in the Javanese royal court of Yogyakarta and Surakarta keratons, especially among nobles and abdi dalem (palace servants). However, in recent years, this also had stirred debate between the efforts to preserve classic Javanese court culture against the growing conservatism, bigotism, fanaticism and Islamism that currently growing among Indonesian Muslims community.

Uses 

Traditional kemben is worn by wrapping a piece of cloth around the torso, folding and securing the edge, tying it with additional rope, and covering it with an angkin, a smaller sash around the abdomen. Traditional Javanese batik kemben worn by palace ladies in keratons are mostly this type of kemben. Today, there is also tight-fitted and tailored kemben secured using buttons, straps or zippers similar to the western corset. The kemben of female Javanese traditional dancers (srimpi or wayang wong) are usually made of tailored velvet corsets.

Kemben outside Indonesia 
In the Malay peninsula, kemban is essentially a type of sarong and a very popular style of clothing prior to the prevalence of Baju Kurung and Baju Kebaya in Malaysia. The members of the nobility used better quality and designed cloths, as well as elaborate jewelry made of gold and precious stones. They had their kain kelubung (shawl) to cover their heads from the scorching sun and a kain kemban worn from the bust downwards to keep them cool in the tropical heat. According to the Sejarah Melayu (Malay Annals), Sultan Mansur Shah, the sixth Malaccan ruler, banned Malay women from wearing only a kemban as it ran contrary to personal modesty based on Islamic teachings. Today, the kemban torso wrap is rarely worn in the piously Islamic Malay community of Malaysia, regarded as a relic of the past, replaced by the more modest Baju Kurung which is generally worn with tudong to comply with Islamic modesty requirements.

In Europe, it is akin to European décolletage, however, it is more indigenous by using local fabrics such as batik, ikat, songket, or tenun, and simply secured by folding and slipping the cloth edges and tying the knot. Traditionally, women wear two pieces of clothes; the lower one is wrapped around the hips covering lower parts of the body (hips, thighs, and legs) and is called as kain or Sarong, while the piece that is wrapped about the upper body (chest and torso) is called kemben. In the Malay peninsula, a third piece of cloth is used to cover the head (head, shoulders, and arms) from the sun and it is called kain kelubung as shown in the pictures below.

See also 

 National costume of Indonesia
 Culture of Indonesia
 Javanese culture
 Malay culture
 Kebaya
 Malaysian cultural outfits

References 

Indonesian clothing
Indonesian culture
Javanese culture
Malay culture
Malaysian culture
Malay clothing
History of Asian clothing